Prudence (contracted from  meaning "seeing ahead, sagacity") is the ability to govern and discipline oneself by the use of reason. It is classically considered to be a virtue, and in particular one of the four cardinal virtues (which are, with the three theological virtues, part of the seven virtues). Prudentia is an allegorical female personification of the virtue, whose attributes are a mirror and snake, who is frequently depicted as a pair with Justitia, the Roman goddess of Justice.

The word derives from the 14th-century Old French word prudence, which, in turn, derives from the Latin prudentia meaning "foresight, sagacity". It is often associated with wisdom, insight, and knowledge.  In this case, the virtue is the ability to judge between virtuous and vicious actions, not only in a general sense, but with regard to appropriate actions at a given time and place. Although prudence itself does not perform any actions, and is concerned solely with knowledge, all virtues had to be regulated by it. Distinguishing when acts are courageous, as opposed to reckless or cowardly, is an act of prudence, and for this reason it is classified as a cardinal (pivotal) virtue.

In modern English, the word has become increasingly synonymous with cautiousness.  In this sense, prudence names a reluctance to take risks, which remains a virtue with respect to unnecessary risks, but, when unreasonably extended into over-cautiousness, can become the vice of cowardice.

In the Nicomachean Ethics, Aristotle gives a lengthy account of the virtue phronesis, traditionally translated as "prudence", although this has become increasingly problematic as the word has fallen out of common usage.  More recently ϕρόνησις has been translated by such terms as "practical wisdom", "practical judgment" or "rational choice".

As the "mother" of all virtues 

Prudence was considered by the ancient Greeks and later on by Christian philosophers, most notably Thomas Aquinas, as the cause, measure and form of all virtues. It is considered to be the auriga virtutum or the charioteer of the virtues. It's mentioned in  the fifth of the Principal Doctrines of Epicurus, and in his Letter to Menoeceus, where he says: "Prudence is the foundation of all these things and is the greatest good. Thus it is more valuable than philosophy and is the source of every other excellence."

It is the cause in the sense that the virtues, which are defined to be the "perfected ability" of man as a spiritual person (spiritual personhood in the classical western understanding means having intelligence and free will), achieve their "perfection" only when they are founded upon prudence, that is to say upon the perfected ability to make right decisions. For instance, a person can live temperance when he has acquired the habit of deciding correctly the actions to take in response to his instinctual cravings.

The function of prudence is to point out which course of action is to be taken in any concrete circumstances. It has nothing to do with directly willing the good it discerns. Prudence has a directive capacity with regard to the other virtues. It lights the way and measures the arena for their exercise. Without prudence, bravery becomes foolhardiness; mercy sinks into weakness, free self-expression and kindness into censure, humility into degradation and arrogance, selflessness into corruption, and temperance into fanaticism. Culture and disciplined actions should be about the beneficial action. Its office is to determine for each in practice those circumstances of time, place, manner, etc. which should be observed, and which the Scholastics comprise under the term "medium rationis". So it is that while it qualifies the intellect and not the will, it is nevertheless rightly styled a moral virtue.

Prudence is considered the measure of moral virtues since it provides a model of ethically good actions. "The work of art is true and real by its correspondence with the pattern of its prototype in the mind of the artist. In similar fashion, the free activity of man is good by its correspondence with the pattern of prudence." (Josef Pieper) 

In Greek and Scholastic philosophy, "form" is the specific characteristic of a thing that makes it what it is. With this language, prudence confers upon other virtues the form of its inner essence; that is, its specific character as a virtue. For instance, not all acts of telling the truth are considered good, considered as done with the virtue of honesty. What makes telling the truth a virtue is whether it is done with prudence.

Versus imprudence, cunning and false prudence 

In Christian understanding, the difference between prudence and cunning lies in the intent with which the decision of the context of an action is made. The Christian understanding of the world includes the existence of God, the natural law and moral implications of human actions. In this context, prudence is different from cunning in that it takes into account the supernatural good. For instance, the decision of persecuted Christians to be martyred rather than deny their faith is considered prudent.

According to Thomas Aquinas, judgments using reasons for evil ends or using evil means are considered to be made through "cunning" and "false prudence" and not through prudence.

The Ancient Greek term for prudence is synonymous with "forethought". People, the Ancient Greeks believed, must have enough prudence to prepare for worshiping the Olympian gods.

Integral parts 

Prudence is the application of universal principles to particular situations. "Integral parts" of virtues, in Scholastic philosophy, are the elements that must be present for any complete or perfect act of the virtue. The following are the integral parts of prudence:
 Memoria : accurate memory; that is, memory that is true to reality; an ability to learn from experience;
 Docilitas : an open-mindedness that recognizes variety and is able to seek and make use of the experience and authority of others;
 Intelligentia : the understanding of first principles;
 Sollertia : shrewdness or quick-wittedness, i.e. the ability to evaluate a situation quickly;
 Ratio : Discursive reasoning and the ability to research and compare alternatives;
 Providentia : foresight – i.e. the capacity to estimate whether particular actions can realize goals;
 Circumspection : the ability to take all relevant circumstances into account;
 Caution : the ability to mitigate risk.

Prudential judgment 

In ethics, a "prudential judgment" is one where the circumstances must be weighed to determine the correct action.  Generally, it applies to situations where two people could weigh the circumstances differently and ethically come to different conclusions.

For instance, in the theory of just war, the government of a nation must weigh whether the harms they suffer are more than the harms that would be produced by their going to war against another nation that is harming them; the decision whether to go to war is therefore a prudential judgment.

In another case, a patient who has a terminal illness with no conventional treatment may hear of an experimental treatment.  To decide whether to take it would require weighing on one hand, the cost, time, possible lack of benefit, and possible pain, disability, and hastened death, and on the other hand, the possible benefit and the benefit to others of what could be learned from his or her case.

In rhetoric 

Phronesis, or practical wisdom, holds an important place in rhetorical theory as a central aspect of judgment and practice. Aristotle's notion of phronesis fits with his notes on rhetoric because neither, in his estimation, could be reduced to an episteme or a techne, and both deal with the ability to deliberate about contingent, variable, or indeterminate matters.

Cicero defined prudentia as a rhetorical norm in De Oratore, De officiis, De Inventione, and De re publica. He contrasts the term with imprudens, young men failing to consider the consequences before they act. The prudens, or those who had prudence, knew when to speak and when to stay silent. Cicero maintained that prudence was gained only through experience, and while it was applied in everyday conversation, in public discourse it was subordinated to the broader term for wisdom, sapientia.

In the contemporary era, rhetorical scholars have tried to recover a robust meaning for the term. They have maintained consistency with the ancient orators, contending that prudence is an embodied persuasive resource. Although sets of principles or rules can be constructed in a particular culture, scholars agree that prudence cannot be derived from a set of timeless principles. Instead, through gauging the situation and through reasoned deliberation, a speaker should determine the set of values and morals by which to base his or her actions. Furthermore, scholars suggest the capacity to take into account the particularities of the situation as vital to prudential practice. For example, as rhetorical scholar Lois Self explains, "both rhetoric and phronesis are normative processes in that they involve rational principles of choice-making; both have general applicability but always require careful analysis of particulars in determining the best response to each specific situation; both ideally take into account the wholeness of human nature; and finally, both have social utility and responsibility in that both treat matter of the public good". Robert Hariman, in his examination of Malcolm X, adds that "aesthetic sensibility, imitation of a performative ideal, and improvisation upon conventions of presentation" are also components of practical reasoning.

Small differences emerge between rhetorical scholars regarding definitions of the term and methods of analysis. Hans-Georg Gadamer asserted that prudence materializes through the application of principles and can be evaluated accordingly. In his analysis of Andrew Cuomo's speech to the Catholic Church of Notre Dame, James Jasinski contends that prudence cannot  as it is not a episteme or techne; instead, it is judged according to embodied rhetorical performance. Thus, while Gadamer would judge prudence based on the execution of contingent principles, Jasinski would examine the artistry of communication in its cultural milieu between accommodation (compromise) and audacity (courage).

In his study of Machiavelli, examining the relationship between prudence and moderation, rhetorician Eugene Garver holds that there is a middle ground between "an ethics of principles, in which those principles univocally dictate action" and "an ethics of consequences, in which the successful result is all". His premise stems from Aristotle's theory of virtue as an "intermediate", in which moderation and compromise embody prudence. Yet, because valorizing moderation is not an active response, prudence entails the "transformation of moderation" into a fitting response, making it a flexible situational norm. Garver also asserts that prudential reasoning differs from "algorithmic" and "heuristic" reasoning because it is rooted in a political community, the context in which common problems regarding stability and innovation arise and call for prudential reasoning.

In economics 

Economists describe a consumer as "prudent" if he or she saves more when faced with riskier future income. This additional saving is called precautionary saving.

If a risk-averse consumer has a utility function  over consumption x, and if  is differentiable, then the consumer is not prudent unless the third derivative of utility is positive, that is, .

The strength of the precautionary saving motive can be measured by absolute prudence, which is defined as
. Similarly, relative prudence is defined as absolute prudence, multiplied by the level of consumption. These measures are closely related to the concepts of absolute and relative risk aversion developed by Kenneth Arrow and John W. Pratt.

In accounting 

In accounting, prudence was long considered one of the "fundamental accounting concepts" in its determination of the time for revenue recognition. The rule of prudence meant that gains should not be anticipated unless their realisation was highly probable. However, recent developments in Generally Accepted Accounting Principles have led academic critics to accuse the international standard-setting body IASB of abandoning prudence. In the British reporting standard FRS 18, prudence, along with consistency, was relegated to a "desirable" quality of financial information rather than fundamental concept. Prudence was rejected for IFRS because it was seen as compromising accounts' neutrality.

In a 2011 report on the financial crisis of 2007–08, the British House of Lords bemoaned the demotion of prudence as a governing principle of accounting and audit. Their comments, however, were disputed by some leading practitioners.

See also 
 Prudence (given name)
 Phronesis, in Greek philosophy: practical wisdom

References

External links 

 Summa Theologica "Second Part of the Second Part" (Questions 47–56).
 "Prudence" at the Catholic Encyclopedia.

Virtue
Christian ethics